Yeshivat Har Etzion (YHE), commonly known in English as "Gush" and in Hebrew as "Yeshivat HaGush", is a hesder yeshiva located in Alon Shvut, an Israeli settlement in Gush Etzion. It is considered one of the leading institutions of advanced Torah study in the world and with a student body of roughly 480, it is one of the largest hesder yeshivot in the West Bank.

History
In 1968, shortly after the Six-Day War, a movement was founded to resettle the Gush Etzion region, from which Jews had been expelled following the Kfar Etzion massacre. Yehuda Amital, a prominent rabbi and Jewish educator, was asked to head a yeshiva in the region. In 1971, Rabbi Aharon Lichtenstein moved from the United States to join Amital as rosh yeshiva. First established in Kfar Etzion, it moved to Alon Shvut, where it developed into a major institution. The current yeshiva building was finished in 1977.

In 1997 a women’s beit midrash was established for Israeli and overseas students as a sister school in Kibbutz Migdal Oz, which goes by the name Migdal Oz.

On January 4, 2006, Rabbis Yaakov Medan and Baruch Gigi joined  Amital and  Lichtenstein as rashei yeshiva in anticipation of Amital's upcoming retirement. Amital's involvement in the yeshiva effectively ended due to illness in the later months of 2009, and he died in July 2010.  Mosheh Lichtenstein, son of  Aharon Lichtenstein, was appointed as rosh yeshiva alongside and to eventually replace his father in 2008;  Aharon Lichtenstein died in April 2015. The current rashei yeshiva are Rav Yaakov Medan, Rav Baruch Gigi and Rav Mosheh Lichtenstein.

Most of the students are Israelis in the hesder program, which integrates intensive yeshiva study with at least 15 months of active service in the Israel Defense Forces, an idea developed by the founding Rosh Yeshiva, Rav Yehuda Amital. 

There is a post-high school overseas program which receives students from the United States, Canada, the United Kingdom and France. There is also a Southern Hemisphere program for students from South Africa, New Zealand and Australia under Bnei Akiva's MTA program. Yeshivat Darkaynu, a yeshiva program for students with special needs is housed on the YHE campus.

Several of the overseas students join the Israeli Hesder program and make aliyah. Most return to university outside of Israel. Some students eventually come back to the yeshiva to study for the rabbinate in the yeshiva's Semicha Program (Semicha given by the Israeli Rabbanut) and affiliated Herzog College. 

Many alumni, both overseas and Israeli, have gone on to become rashei yeshiva or to take on other rabbinical positions in Israel and abroad. Over 550 alumni from overseas have made aliyah and a high percentage are involved in Jewish education. Others have gone on to prominent academic careers in fields such as science, law, medicine, engineering and mathematics.

Educational and religious philosophy
Yeshivat Har Etzion advocates a combination of Torah study and a love of the Jewish people and the Land of Israel. It is known for a more moderate and open approach to the role of religion in the modern world. The yeshiva encourages serious study, creative thought, intellectual rigor, and a universal, humanistic outlook.
The central focus of study is the Gemara or Talmud and the yeshiva is known in Israel and abroad for its rigorous standards of Talmud learning.  However other areas of Jewish learning are also taught, including Tanach (Bible), Mussar (ethics and character development), Machshava (Jewish Thought), and Halakha LeMaaseh (practical Jewish law).

The study of Gemara at the yeshiva "trains talmidim [students] to analyze, explore and evaluate differing opinions in the hope that they will grow to be discerning individuals [and] sophisticated thinkers..." 
In particular, the Yeshiva emphasizes the Brisker method of Talmud study, a method innovated by Rabbi Chaim Soloveitchik; see .
Some have argued that the complexity with which the yeshiva's students regard both Jewish and global matters can be seen as a product of the Brisker methodology, emphasizing as it does the compounded and dichotomous nature of many issues and subjects.  The yeshiva's relatively liberal and open worldview is also seen as a product of this Brisker approach, viewing the world as complex, a composite of many different dichotomous principles, whose inherent tension needs to be recognised.

The yeshiva actively encourages ethical and philosophical study, both academically, and especially so as to cultivate the student's love of Torah study and religious commitment.
 
Numerous formal shiurim are offered in these areas daily, 
 
and students are encouraged to also study these areas privately.
However unlike a classic Mussar yeshiva, there is no formal Mussar seder (a study session set aside for learning moral-ethical texts).

The yeshiva is also well known for its pioneering and continuing role in the study of Tanach. 
From the yeshiva’s conception it was desired that Tanach would have an important role, something uncommon for Yeshivot at the time, 
 
and the Yeshiva thus pioneered the "Bible Revolution", "מהפכת התנ״ך", a renaissance in the status of and approach to Tanach study in the Religious Zionist (and broader religious)  public, led by Rabbis Medan and Yoel Bin-Nun.  
This approach emphasises the literal meaning (peshat) of biblical verses, but also takes into account the overall structure of the relevant section, the context and any intertextual references. It includes a more psychological and literary approach to character and narrative analysis, often known as "תנ"ך בגובה העיניים" ("Tanach at Eye Level"), all the while incorporating the views and ideas of the Midrash and later Rabbinical commentaries. 
In the past, Rabbi Mordechai Breuer, the founder of the Shitat Habechinot ("The Aspects Approach"), also taught at the yeshiva. 

Many of the yeshiva's teachers and alumni have published sefarim on Tanach. For example, the "Torah MiEtzion" series presents essays on the five books of the Torah from the rabbis of the yeshiva. The approach of the series is "centered on learning the 'simple meaning' of the text but also incorporating the disciplines of literary theory, geography, archeology and history in order to better understand the text." Together with Herzog College, the Yeshiva produces several formal publications in the field, including the Journal Megadim.

Libraries
The Yeshiva operates two libraries. The Torah Library is the largest of any yeshiva in Israel, with over 90,000 volumes, as well as CDs, microfilms, rare Judaica and antique books, including the personal collection of Rav  collection and a four-hundred year-old collection from the Etz Chayim community of Amsterdam. The Pedagogic Resource Center of the Herzog College supplements the central Torah library, providing audio-visual material for teachers of Judaic studies in Israel and worldwide.

Online platforms
The Israel Koschitzky Virtual Beit Midrash provides yeshiva-style courses and shiurim (lectures) in Torah and Judaism to students of all ages online. Over 18,000 subscribers around the world subscribe to weekly shiurim, in English, Hebrew and Russian covering subjects such as Tanakh, Gemara, Halakha, Jewish philosophy and various other Jewish topics.

KMTT is a daily Torah study Podcast from Yeshivat Har Etzion which is sent out every day of the week.

Notable faculty
 Yehuda Amital  – Founding Rosh Yeshiva, founder of the Meimad party
 Amnon Bazak – Ram and lecturer at Herzog College
 Yoel Bin-Nun – co-founder of Yeshivat Har Etzion and Gush Emunim
 Mordechai Breuer – leading expert on Tanakh
 Baruch Gigi – Rosh Yeshiva
 Aharon Lichtenstein – Rosh Yeshiva, 
 Mosheh Lichtenstein – Rosh Yeshiva
 Yaakov Medan – Rosh Yeshiva
 Hanan Porat

Notable alumni
 Michael Abraham – Rabbi and physicist at Bar-Ilan University
 Zechariah Baumel – American-Israeli IDF soldier 
 Assaf Bednarsh – Rosh Yeshiva of Rabbi Isaac Elchanan Theological Seminary
 Shalom Berger –  Scholar and educational activist
 Ari Berman – Fifth President of Yeshiva University
Joshua Berman – Professor of Bible at Bar-Ilan University
Eliahu Birnbaum – Former Chief Rabbi of Uruguay and Turin, rabbi of Shavei Israel, head of the Straus-Amiel Institute
 Eliyahu Blumenzweig – Rosh Yeshiva of Yeshivat HaHesder Yerucham
 Tzvika Brot –  Mayor of Bat Yam 
 Yuval Cherlow – Rosh Yeshiva of Yeshivat Orot Shaul
 Shmuel David – Rabbi of Afula, former rabbi of Rosh Tzurim
 Ze'ev Elkin – Israeli politician 
 Michael Eisenberg – Venture capitalist and author 
 Ron Yitzchok Eisenman – American Orthodox rabbi
 Matanyahu Englman – State Comptroller of Israel
 Yehuda Etzion – Israeli right-wing activist 
 Adam Ferziger – American-Israeli social historian
 Daniel Fridman – Rabbi of Jewish Center of Teaneck
 Yehuda Gilad – Rosh Yeshiva of Maale Gilboa
 Yehudah Glick – Israeli political activist and politician
 Tamir Granot – Rosh Yeshiva of Yeshivat Orot Shaul
 Steven Greenberg – First openly homosexual Orthodox rabbi
 Jason Greenblatt –  Assistant to the President and Special Representative for International Negotiations under Donald Trump
 Aviad Hacohen – Israeli attorney and professor of law
 Gershon HaCohen – Aluf in the Israel Defense Forces
 Re'em Ha'Cohen – Rosh Yeshiva of Yeshivat Otniel, rabbi of Otniel 
 Moshe Halbertal –  Israeli philosopher
 Nathaniel Helfgot – President of International Rabbinic Fellowship
 Howard Jachter –  American Orthodox rabbi, Dayan, educator, author and communal leader, expert on the laws of Jewish divorce
 Dov Kalmanovich –  Israeli politician
 Moshe Koppel – American-Israeli computer scientist
 Amichai Lau-Lavie – Israeli-American Conservative rabbi
 Binyamin Lau – Israeli Orthodox rabbi,  Rav of Kehillat Ramban in Katamon, Jerusalem
 Shamai Leibowitz –  American lawyer
Shlomo Levi – former head of Kollel at Yeshivat Har Etzion, President of the Yeshivat Hesder Gavoa Kiryat Gat
 Avraham Lifshitz – Israeli rabbi, former head of State Religious Education of the Ministry of Education in Israel 
 Dov Linzer – Rosh Yeshiva of Yeshivat Chovevei Torah
 Jacob Ezra Merkin – American investor
 Avraham Michaeli – Member of Knesset 
 David Mintz – Israeli judge who currently serves on the Supreme Court of Israel
 Ephraim Mirvis – Chief Rabbi of the UK and Commonwealth
 Menachem Penner – Dean of the Rabbi Isaac Elchanan Theological Seminary, Rabbi Emeritus of Young Israel of Holliswood
 Alex Pomson –  Managing Director of Rosov Consulting
 Shabtai Rappaport – Rosh Yeshiva of Yeshivat Shvut Yisrael
 Yosef Zvi Rimon – former ram at the yeshiva, Rabbi of the Gush Etzion Regional Council and leading expert in Halakha
 David Shlomo Rosen – Former Chief Rabbi of Ireland
 Jonathan Rosenblatt – American Modern Orthodox rabbi
 Shlomo Rosenfeld – Founder and Rosh Yeshiva of Yeshivat Shadmot Neria, rabbi of the Emek HaMaayanot Regional Council
 Itamar Rosensweig –  Rabbi and maggid shiur at Yeshiva University and dayan (rabbinic judge) at the Beth Din of America
 Michael Rosensweig – Rosh Yeshiva at Rabbi Isaac Elchanan Theological Seminary 
 Yehuda Sarna – Chief Rabbi of Jewish Community of the United Arab Emirates
 Hanan Schlesinger – American-Israeli Orthodox rabbi, co-founder of Roots, a joint Palestinian-Israeli grassroots peacemaking initiative
 Zvi Schreiber – British-Israeli  entrepreneur
 Elliot Schrier – Mara d'asra of Congregation Bnai Yeshurun in Teaneck
 Azi Schwartz – Senior Chazzan (cantor) of the Park Avenue Synagogue
 Sharon Shalom – Ethiopian-Israeli community Rabbi
 Scott J. Shapiro – Professor of Philosophy and Law at Yale Law School
 Eli Baruch Shulman – Rosh Yeshiva at the Rabbi Isaac Elchanan Theological Seminary 
 Noam Sohlberg – Israeli Supreme Court of Israel judge
 Moshe Tur-Paz – Israeli politician
 Ben-Tzion Spitz – Chief Rabbi of Uruguay, writer and Nuclear Engineer
 Shaul Stampfer – American historian, academic and author
 Kalman Topp –  American rabbi, Beth Jacob Congregation of Beverly Hills, California
 Zev Weitman –  Rabbi of Tnuva, Rabbi of Alon Shvut

See also
Migdal Oz (seminary)
Herzog College
Megadim

External links

Virtual Beit Midrash
YouTube channel

References

 
Educational institutions established in 1968
Gush Etzion
Har Etzion
Yeshivas in the West Bank